Khaneqah (also Romanized as Khāneqāh, Khāneqā, Khāneqeh, and Khānqāh) is a village in Kuhpayeh Rural District Rural District, in the Central District of Bardaskan County, Razavi Khorasan Province, Iran. At the 2006 census, its population was 259, in 78 families.

References 

Populated places in Bardaskan County